The Toshiba 4S (Ultra super safe, Small and Simple) is a micro sodium reactor design.

General description 

The plant design is developed by a partnership that includes Toshiba and the Central Research Institute of Electric Power Industry (CRIEPI) of Japan.

The technical specifications of the 4S reactor are unique in the nuclear industry. The actual reactor would be located in a sealed, cylindrical vault 30 m (98 ft) underground, while the building above ground would be 22×16×11 m (72×52.5×36 ft) in size.  This power plant is designed to provide 10 megawatts of electrical power with a 50 MW version available in the future.

The 4S is a fast neutron sodium reactor. It uses neutron reflector panels around the perimeter to maintain neutron density. These reflector panels replace complicated control rods, yet keep the ability to shut down the nuclear reaction in case of an emergency. Additionally, the Toshiba 4S utilizes liquid sodium as a coolant, allowing the reactor to operate 200 degrees hotter than if it used water.  Although water would readily boil at these temperatures, sodium remains a liquid; the sodium coolant therefore exerts very low pressure on the reactor vessel even at extremely high temperatures. 

The Toshiba 4S Nuclear Battery was proposed as the power source for the Galena Nuclear Power Plant in Alaska, but the project was abandoned in 2011 and Toshiba did not proceed with an application for certification of the design.

Criticism 
A research team including Allison Macfarlane and Rodney C. Ewing evaluated waste production of a number of small nuclear reactors, including the 4s, and published their findings in Proceedings of the National Academy of Sciences of the United States of America. They found that small modular reactors produce more radioactive waste than conventional reactors. These claims were contested by NuScale Power.

See also
 CAREM
 NuScale
 Hyperion nuclear reactor (hydride)
 mPower by Babcock & Wilcox Company
 Traveling wave reactor

References

External links 
 IAEA Advanced Reactors Information System: 4S (2013)
 IAEA ARIS Status Report (2019)
 NRC overview Official information from Nuclear Regulatory Commission
 Atomic Insights article information about the reactor, its specifications, and engineering aspects and challenges.
 ROE: Technical details about the 4S planned for Galena, Alaska.
 http://www.yritwc.org/Portals/0/PDFs/nuclearreactorletterucs.pdf

Nuclear power reactor types
Nuclear technology in Japan